HD 76270, also known as HR 3544, is a solitary, white hued star located in the southern circumpolar constellation Volans. It has an apparent magnitude of 6.10, making it faintly visible to the naked eye if viewed under ideal conditions.

HD 76270 was considered as a chemically peculiar Am star, and as a result, was given a spectral classification of A3mA6-7 by Nancy Houk and A.P Cowley. This means it is an A3 star with the metallic lines of a star with a class of A6-7. However, this peculiarity is now considered doubtful. An alternate class of A5 III/IV was given, instead making it an evolved A-type star with a blended luminosity class of a subgiant and a giant star.

At present it has 5.3 times the mass of the Sun but has expanded to 22.9 times its girth. HR 3544 is metal deficient, having an iron abundance 64% below solar levels. A 1984 study used HD 76270 as a comparison star and suspected it of being slightly variable, but this has not been confirmed and it is not even listed as a suspected variable in the General Catalogue of Variable Stars.

References 

Volans (constellation)
A-type giants
Am stars
076270
3544
043351
CD−72 00488
Volantis, 44
A-type subgiants